There have been four creations of baronetcies with the surname Baker. They are listed in order of creation.

Baker of Sisinghurst, Kent (1611) 
A family with the surname of Baker settled in Kent at Cranbrooke in the 14th century. In 1480 Sir John Baker (1488–1558), Attorney General, Speaker of the House of Commons and Chancellor of the Exchequer, acquired an estate at Sissinghurst where his son Richard Baker (1528–1574) built Sissinghurst Castle. A grandson of Sir John was Richard Baker (chronicler).

The Baronetcy was created in the Baronetage of England on 29 June 1611 for Henry Baker of Sissinghurst Castle, grandson of Richard Baker. The second Baronet served as High Sheriff of Kent in 1635. The Baronetcy was extinct on the death of the third Baronet in 1661.

Sir Henry Baker, 1st Baronet (c. 1587–1623)
Sir John Baker, 2nd Baronet (c.1608–1653)
Sir John Baker, 3rd Baronet (died 1661), extinct.

Baker of Loventor, Devon (1776)
Created in the Baronetage of Great Britain
See Baker Wilbraham baronets

Baker of Dunstable, Bedfordshire (1796)
Created in the Baronetage of Great Britain
See Sherston-Baker baronets

Baker of Ranston, Dorset (1802)

Created in the Baronetage of the United Kingdom on 6 January 1817
Lieutenant-colonel Sir Edward Baker (né Baker Littlehales), 1st Baronet (died 1825), married Elizabeth-Mary Fitzgerald, third daughter of William FitzGerald, 2nd Duke of Leinster
Sir Edward Baker, 2nd Baronet (1806–1877)
Sir Talbot Hastings Bendall Baker, 3rd Baronet (1820–1900), canon of Salisbury Cathedral
Sir Randolf Littlehales Baker, 4th Baronet (20 July 1879 – 23 July 1959). Extinct on his death.

References

 

1611 establishments in England
Extinct baronetcies in the Baronetage of England
Baronetcies in the Baronetage of Great Britain
Extinct baronetcies in the Baronetage of the United Kingdom